Asham Quarry is a  geological Site of Special Scientific Interest north of Newhaven in East Sussex. It is a Geological Conservation Review site and in the Sussex Downs Area of Outstanding Natural Beauty.

This site provides important biostratigraphical and lithostratigraphical evidence about environmental conditions during the last 100,000 years, the Last Glacial Period and the Holocene. It is notable for its extensive early and mid Holocene deposits and for having yielded a series of radiocarbon dates.

References

Sites of Special Scientific Interest in East Sussex
Geological Conservation Review sites